Simkot is a rural municipality located in Humla District of Karnali Province of Nepal.

The rural municipality is divided into total 8 wards and the headquarters of the rural municipality is situated at Simikot.

Simikot airport is one and only airport of Humla, located on Simikot. Simkot serves as  the gateway to Mansarobar/ Kailash pilgrimage.

Demographics
At the time of the 2011 Nepal census, 80.0% of the population in Simkot Rural Municipality spoke Nepali, 18.7% Tamang, 0.3% Magar, 0.3% Sign language, 0.2% Maithili and 0.1% Doteli as their first language; 0.4% spoke other languages.

In terms of ethnicity/caste, 40.5% were Chhetri, 25.1% Thakuri, 19.1% Tamang, 9.9% Kami, 1.9% Damai/Dholi, 1.1% Hill Brahmin, 0.8% Byasi/Sauka, 0.5% Magar and 1.1% others.

In terms of religion, 80.2% were Hindu, 19.4% Buddhist, 0.2% Christian, 0.1% Muslim and 0.1% others.

References

External links
 Official website

Populated places in Humla District
Rural municipalities in Karnali Province
Rural municipalities of Nepal established in 2017